Róbert Hegedüs (born 19 February 1973) is a Hungarian sprint canoeist who competed from the mid-1990s to early 2000s. He won ten medals at the ICF Canoe Sprint World Championships with seven golds (K-2 200 m: 1997, 1998, 1999; K-4 200 m: 1998, 1999, 2001; K-4 500 m: 1997), a silver (K-4 200 m: 1997), and two bronzes (K-4 200 m: 2002, K-4 500 m: 1994).

Hegedüs also finished ninth in the K-2 1000 m event at the 1996 Summer Olympics in Atlanta.

References

External links

1973 births
Canoeists at the 1996 Summer Olympics
Hungarian male canoeists
Living people
Olympic canoeists of Hungary
ICF Canoe Sprint World Championships medalists in kayak
20th-century Hungarian people